Martina Trevisan was the defending champion but chose not to participate.

Zheng Qinwen won the title, defeating Wang Xiyu 6–4, 4–6, 6–3 in the final.

Seeds

Draw

Finals

Top half

Bottom half

Qualifying

Seeds

Qualifiers

Lucky loser
  Elsa Jacquemot

First qualifier

Second qualifier

Third qualifier

Fourth qualifier

References

External Links
Main Draw

BBVA Open Internacional de Valencia - Singles